1 New York Street is a high-rise office building in Manchester city centre, England. Designed by Denton Corker Marshall, the building is situated on Mosley Street opposite 38 and 42 Mosley Street. The building opened in 2009 with Bank of New York Mellon as its main tenant.

Architecture
The design consists of two glass and metal 'boxes' that appear to jut out of the main building, while the building façade consists of glass and aluminium cladding. The city centre location of the 1 New York Street site presented a number of challenges due to adjacent tram lines in the road and tunnels underneath the building. To minimise disturbance to both the tram lines and the surrounding area, the existing basement structure was used in conjunction with new pile foundations. 1 New York Street was the first speculative building in central Manchester to be awarded a BREEAM 'excellent' rating.

Occupancy
As of March 2023, the building is occupied by AECOM, CNA Hardy, DC Advisory, Johnson Controls, Marks & Clerk and Turley.

References

Skyscrapers in Manchester
Modernist architecture in England
Office buildings completed in 2009
Office buildings in Manchester